The West Tamar Highway is a highway in Tasmania, Australia.  It covers the western edge of the Tamar River, from Launceston to the beach town of Greens Beach.

It is labelled as state route A7.

Major intersections
Four shielded routes terminate at the intersections of streets in the Launceston CBD. Because all the involved streets are one-way each route has separate inbound and outbound termini. One of these routes is the West Tamar Highway. Distances from each terminus to a point on the route may not be identical. Those shown below are from the outbound terminus.

See also

References

External links

Tasmania's Highways on OZROADS

Highways in Tasmania
Northern Tasmania